Hekro Towers is a skyscraper in the Central Business District of Johannesburg, South Africa. Standing at an estimated 384.47 feet, it is 30 storeys tall.

The building was constructed in 1969 as the President Hotel, and later operated as a Holiday Inn, before being converted to offices. It is owned by the Universal Church of the Kingdom of God, which also owns a church located next door.

References 
Amethyst: Johannesburg Landmarks. Retrieved 11 February 2008.

Skyscraper office buildings in Johannesburg
Buildings and structures completed in 1969
20th-century architecture in South Africa